The Proximus Group is a provider of digital services and communication in Belgium and the international markets. In Belgium, its main products and services are offered under the Proximus, Scarlet, and Mobile Vikings brands. The Group is also active in Luxembourg as Proximus Luxembourg SA, under the brand names Tango and Telindus Luxembourg, and in the Netherlands through Telindus Netherlands. The Group's international carrier activities are carried out by BICS and Telesign one of the world's leading voice carriers and the largest provider of mobile data services worldwide. Proximus Accelerators, its ecosystem of IT partners (Be-Mobile, ClearMedia, Codit, Davinsi Labs, Proximus Spearit, Telindus and Umbrio), support companies in their digital transformation.

As of 31 December 2021, 53,51% of the Proximus Group is owned by the Belgian State. 4,52% are Proximus’ own shares, the remaining 41,97% are free-floating.

History

1879 to World War I: the beginning of telephony in Belgium
In 1879, the Belgian telegraph service installed a telephone line in the Parliament building. In the same year, several private contractors submitted requests to operate telephone networks in various Belgian cities. The lack of legislation during these first few years obstructed the telephone network's chances of developing. It forced the Belgian government to develop a legislative framework to regulate telephony in Belgium. In 1896, the whole telephony sector comes into the hands of a public company.

In 1913, a large part of Belgium was connected by telephone. Although the number of subscribers was still small, most railway stations and post and telegraph offices had public telephone booths.

World War I to 1930: transition to an autonomous public company
World War I caused an abrupt suspension of telecommunications in Belgium due to the public company's financial situation. To reverse the damages caused during the war, including the dismantling of parts of the network, huge investments were required.
On 19 July 1930, the RTT, Belgium's national telegraph and telephone company, is born and brings the telephone into the homes of a constantly growing portion of the Belgian population.

1930 to World War II: RTT’s integration into the state's industrial policy
The state invested huge sums into the Belgian telephone network through the RTT, giving an ever-growing share of the population from different social classes access to telephony.

At the same time, another unfolding development quickly turned into a major expense for the company. During the economic crisis of the 1930s, the government used RTT in its industrial and employment policies. By forcing complete automation of the Belgian telephone network, the government tried to reduce the high unemployment rate in the sector. This strongly restricted the autonomy of the RTT.

The act of 1930 explicitly stated that the company could draw up and implement an investment plan independently, but the state went against the basic principle of this act by imposing its employment policy. This quickly became a structural problem for the RTT after the war.

World War II to 1986: high-tech company to a crisis
The RTT faced considerable damage and the dismantling of part of its networks after WWII. To boost the sector, the state decided to intervene financially.

During the same period, the demand for telecommunication services exploded from approximately 350,000 subscribers in 1946 to 522,000 in 1951 and more than a million in 1965. This growth led to a very high rate of investment, putting RTT at the forefront of social and technological development in the late sixties.

There was also a downside to this expansion policy. From the late sixties, debts started to accumulate. And the global economic crisis in 1973 did not help. Furthermore, the company was caught up in a corruption scandal: the RTT scandal. The company's financial situation only worsened and, from the mid-seventies, the RTT was forced to cut costs.

During the eighties, it seemed that the telecommunications sector would be one of the key areas of development in the late 20th century. So, in 1981, RTT launched a major reorganisation to solve certain structural problems within the company.

1987 to 2004: the Belgacom Act and the evolution of the sector under Europe's influence
In 1987, another player entered the market: the European Commission, with its Green Paper on a common market for telecommunication services and equipment in which the liberalisation of the market is key. This Green Paper was the basis of the Belgian Act of 21 March 1991, which created a new type of public company with greater autonomy. The Belgian telecommunications sector was reorganised, and in 1992 the RTT was replaced by Belgacom PLC, an autonomous public-sector company. The company and the state entered a management contract that guaranteed the provision of certain public services and gave the company more autonomy than it had from the Act of 1930.

From 1994, the European convergence process began to accelerate. In a new Green Paper, the European Commission declared that network and telephony operations must also be open to competition. Belgacom PLC became a company limited by shares under public law. On 1 July 1994, Belgacom launched the Proximus mobile network, which was soon after entrusted to a subsidiary, Belgacom Mobile. Belgacom remained 75% shareholder, the remaining 25% was owned by Air Touch (Vodafone from 1999).

In 1996, the Belgian government sold 50% minus 1 share of Belgacom to the ADSB Telecommunications consortium. This consortium was composed of Ameritech (SBC), Tele Danmark and Singapore Telecom, plus three Belgian financial institutions: Sofina, Dexia and KBC.

In 1997, Belgacom International Carrier Services (BICS) was born, a carrier & wholesale unit. As the telecom market was fully liberalised by 1 January 1998, Belgacom took over Skynet - the first internet access provider in Belgium and one of the largest web portals in the country. Its Internet activities were integrated into the Belgacom brand which launches ADSL on the Belgian market. In 2000, BICS opened offices in Asia Pacific, America, and the Middle East, while it launched its mobile offer in 2001.

The BeST plan, mainly aimed at reorganising Belgacom and splitting it into four business units, was implemented in 2001. Belgacom also disposed of several activities including Belgacom France, Ben, its security activities, as well as the French activities of Infosources. The consequences of the BeST plan became apparent in 2002. Belgacom had too many employees at the time, so the plan asked a lot of employees to either stop working, work part-time work or retrain.

In an increasingly open market, with ever-aggressive competition, Belgacom decided to radically change its image in 2003 with a new logo, new colours, and a clear desire to be closer to its customers. These radical changes in the company's philosophy were the precursor of the operator's initial public offering. On 22 March 2004, Belgacom entered the stock market. This was one of the most important operations within the European telecom sector since the entry of Orange in February 2001. The Belgian state remained the majority shareholder with 50% + 1 of all shares, while the ADSB consortium sold all its shares.
The IPO enabled the Belgian operator to free up considerable sums to finance its ambitions. The time had come for broadband internet access, and the funding of the Broadway project (to cover the whole Belgian territory with fibre optic cables) required huge investments.

Also in 2004, Belgacom TV was tested in a few hundred homes, to find new sources of income in a market where competition for triple play packages (television, telephony, and internet) such as IPTV was getting fiercer and fiercer.

2005 to 2009: consolidation, convergence, and first bundled offers
In 2005, Belgacom and Swisscom Fixnet signed an agreement to merge their international carrier activities and thus consolidate their position on the international market. Also, Belgacom TV was launched on the Belgian market and Belgacom acquired the broadcasting rights to Belgian football for the next three seasons. Belgacom's digital TV offer via ADSL was the first of its kind in Belgium. It transformed Belgacom into a quadruple-play operator, offering fixed telephony, mobile telephony, high-speed internet as well as television. It also enabled the Belgian company to secure new sources of income, given that the profit margins on its other activities were becoming increasingly smaller. In 2005, Proximus also became the first mobile telephony operator in Belgium to offer 3G services to the public.

In 2006, Belgacom acquired Telindus and strengthened its ICT offer and network integration services for the corporate and professional markets. Belgacom also acquired the remaining 25% stake in Proximus from Vodafone and took over Euremis, which offers mobile CRM to companies in the fast-moving consumer goods (FCMG) and the pharmaceutical sectors. In April 2007, Proximus and Belgacom launched the 'packs', their first bundled offers. Belgacom also continued to develop its digital television offering.

2008 was all about the takeover of Scarlet and Tele2 Luxembourg. Belgacom acquired Scarlet NV, enabling it to penetrate the low-cost market segment. In June 2008, the operator also purchased Tango from Tele2, the leading alternative operator active in Luxembourg and Liechtenstein.

2010 to 2013: TV Everywhere and the first 4G network
In 2010, Belgacom Group completed the full integration of its subsidiaries Belgacom Mobile SA/Proximus, Telindus NV, Telindus Sourcing SA, the activities of Belgacom Skynet SA and the Belgian activities of Telindus Group NV into Belgacom SA to form one legal entity. The other subsidiaries remain separate legal entities. In that same year, partnerships were signed with Jinni, In3Depth, Blinkx and OnLive to further enhance its Belgacom TV entertainment platform. Also, a partnership with FON, the largest Wi-Fi community in the world, was signed.

After several incidents, CEO Didier Bellens was fired in 2011. Ray Stewart and Stefaan De Clerck were appointed temporary CEOs until a new CEO was found.

Also in 2011, Belgacom launched TV Everywhere, allowing customers to watch Belgacom TV on any device (TV, pc, tablet, smartphone) via Wi-Fi and 3G. Belgacom also signed an exclusive partnership with Deezer, enhancing its content offer with music streaming. And BICS signed a roaming hub contract with MTN Group, the largest mobile operator in Africa and the Middle East. Telindus, in turn, launched the brand Telindus Telecom with connectivity and data centre offers for the corporate and professional market.

In 2012, Proximus launched the first 4G network in Belgium and Tango in Luxembourg. Belgacom reinvented its internet by launching Internet Everywhere, for at-home and on the go. And the Belgacom Group acquired the chain of stores The Phone House.

In 2013, Proximus launched new mobile pricing plans based on the customer's type of phone: Smart for customers with a smartphone, and Easy for customers with a traditional mobile phone. Belgacom acquired a highly valuable spectrum for the 800 MHz frequency band to further develop 4G leadership, and it launched Home&Care, that allows customers to remotely monitor their home through their smartphone or tablet. Scarlet, in turn, launched TRIO, combining fixed telephone, broadband internet, and TV.

In the same year, Belgacom, along with the other telecom operators and the Belgian banks, established Belgian Mobile Wallet NV, a joint venture to develop a Belgian mobile payment product under the name Sixdots. Its purpose was to get bank clients to pay with their smartphone instead of their bank card and card reader. The project was not a success and was shelved in 2015.

2014 to 2019: name change from Belgacom to Proximus
On 9 January 2014, Dominique Leroy was appointed the new CEO and chairperson of the Proximus Group executive committee for a period of 6 years. She strengthened the company's offering and focused on growth with her Fit for Growth strategy.

In 2014 as well, it was decided that the Belgacom brand name would be faded out. From autumn 2014, Proximus would be the new commercial name for all fixed, mobile, and IT products. Other brands such as Scarlet continue to exist.

The same year, Belgacom launched Personal Cloud, which allowed customers to store their documents securely, with access to all their content via pc, laptop, tablet, smartphone or Proximus TV, and sharing options with family, friends, and social media.

TV Replay was launched, which allowed customers to go back up to 36 hours on most watched linear TV channels. Thanks to new partnerships such as Apple, and exclusive deals like for some Samsung devices, customers could choose the latest mobile device from a wide variety of brands. And thanks to a partnership with Netflix, customers could watch Netflix directly via Proximus TV. Belgacom also pioneered innovative 4G technology in Belgium, starting the roll-out on the Belgian coast and the main cities including Brussels.

In April 2015, shareholders voted in favour of changing the company name from Belgacom to Proximus. This change has been effective as of 22 June. Next to Proximus PLC under Belgian Public Law, the Proximus Group encompasses Scarlet, Tango, BICS and Telindus International affiliates.
In June 2015, the last Belgacom telephone box was removed. And following a decision from the Belgian Competition Authority, Proximus needed to close some of the 39 remaining The Phone House stores. The Group converted the remaining stores into Proximus Centers.

In 2016, Proximus created a unique Smart Mobility company called Be-Mobile. Proximus also reinvented its commercial offer with the launch of the new all-in products Tuttimus for residential customers and Bizz All-in for small business customers. Also in 2016, Proximus invested in Citie, a smart retail platform to support the local economy and bring traders, shoppers, and local authorities closer together. While in December 2016, Proximus announced Fiber for Belgium, an investment plan of €3 billion over the next ten years, to bring people and business at the speed of light. On mobile, Proximus launched HD voice calls on 3G and 4G and successfully tested the next generation mobile networks 4.5G and 5G.

Fiber for Belgium was first rolled out in seven cities in Belgium in 2017. In the same year, Proximus and Vodafone extended their partnership agreement for Belgium and Luxembourg and Proximus acquired Davinsi Labs, thereby strengthening its position in the growing cyber security market. As of 12 June 2017, Proximus customers were able to surf, call and text within the European Union as they do at home, without any extra cost. The MyProximus app was also launched in 2017. While Proximus acquired the application development company Unbrace, BICS completed the acquisition of Telesign, a communication platform as a service company based in the US. On 29 December 2017, Proximus retires the telegram, after more than 150 years of good, reliable service.

In 2018, Proximus acquired Umbrio to strengthen Proximus’ position in the growing IT and network operations and analytics market, and the Dutch-based company ION-IP to reinforce its position in the growing Benelux Managed Security Market. There was the acquisition of Codit and the Commercial Fiber-to-the-Business wholesale deal with telecom operator Destiny. It was also the year of the first successful 5G outdoor trial in Belgium with Huawei and the launch of the NB-IoT network for the connection of digital gas and electricity meters for Fluvius.

Meanwhile, the main Belgian banks and mobile operators, including Proximus, launched Itsme, a digital identification app that allows Belgian civilians to log on and identify themselves to the government, banks, insurers, and other private enterprises.

2019 to the present day: the digital shift 
In 2019, Proximus launched the #shifttodigital strategy to accelerate its transformation, remain relevant in the Belgian market, and secure the company's future. The plan also comprised a social section which resulted in strikes and protests by some of the staff. After months of negotiations, an agreement was reached between management and trade unions, and the plan was approved by the board of directors.

The brand promise "Think possible" was also launched in 2019, and the digital TV platform Proximus TV became Proximus Pickx. Proximus and Orange Belgium joined forces to develop the mobile access network of the future named MWingz and Proximus Luxembourg SA brought together the Tango and Telindus brands, while the MyProximus app reached the milestone of 1 million active users. Also, Proximus’ smart mobility affiliate Be-Mobile launched the Flux app, for smoother and safer freight traffic.

In September 2019, Proximus announced that Dominique Leroy had decided to leave the company on 1 December to give her career an international turn. CFO Sandrine Dufour temporarily took charge. On 1 December 2019, Guillaume Boutin was appointed the new CEO. He had been at Proximus as Chief Consumer Market Officer since August 2017.

Together with DPG Media and Rossel, Proximus launched a digital press offer called My e-Press and entered a partnership with construction firm Besix around smart buildings. The first 5G demonstrations focused on live video-streaming, industrial robots, drones, virtual reality, and cloud gaming.

In February 2020, Proximus and Port of Antwerp signed a Memorandum of Understanding for the project "The Digital Schelde" to prepare the port's digital transformation by developing a private 5G network. In March, CEO Guillaume Boutin presented his new strategy #inspire2022. The long-term plan was built around four strategic pillars: the roll-out of fixed and mobile gigabit technologies, the transformation into a 'digital native' company, the development of partnerships and ecosystems, and a reinforced focus on a green and digital company.

At the same time, the company announced a considerable acceleration of the roll-out of the fibre optic network. Thanks to joint venture agreements with EQT and Eurofiber reached during the year, the company's ambitions were expanded. The roll-out was launched in sixteen cities in December 2020: Aalst, Antwerp, Brussels, Charleroi, Ghent, Hasselt, Kortrijk, Knokke-Heist, Leuven, Liège, Mechelen, Namur, Ostend, Sint-Niklaas, Roeselare and Vilvoorde.

Proximus launched both the first 5G network in Belgium and "Flex", a new range of packs that can be customized to the needs of each family member. An agreement with Eurofiber and DELTA Fiber was signed, aiming at establishing a partnership to further enlarge and accelerate its fiber roll-out in Belgium. In June 2020, Proximus entered into a strategic partnership with Belfius to establish a neobank – a completely digital internet bank. The name: Banx. Also in 2020, Proximus affiliates Codit and Unbrace merged. Belfius and Proximus signed an unprecedented strategic partnership based on long-term commercial cooperation. An agreement was also reached with Disney+, which means that since September 2020, Proximus has been the only telecom operator in Belgium offering its customers access to the American streaming service.

In 2021, Proximus provided COVID vaccination centres with connectivity, IT support, as well as IoT devices to monitor the temperature of the vaccines. Proximus also acquired Mobile Vikings, reinforcing Proximus’ multi-brand strategy in the residential market, while Banx, the digital app for sustainable banking, entered the Belgian market. The teleconsultation app Doktr was launched, and the Digital Inclusion Charter was signed by the members of DigitAll. Full ownership of BICS was acquired, securing the flexibility to execute the development and growth path of BICS and Telesign. Also in 2021, Antonietta Mastroianni, Chief Digital & IT Officer, and Mark Reid, Chief Financial Officer joined the executive committee.

BICS secured partnerships with key digital players such as Microsoft Azure and Google Cloud, adding to those already in place with Amazon Web Services and other Tier 1 digital disruptors in the APAC region. BICS also launched voice APIs.

Telesign, in turn, announced its intent to go public and launched Messaging API, which allows for multiple messaging channels to be consumed with only one API integration. Also, an updated anti-fraud model of the Score product was launched, increasing the accuracy of flagging fraud while reducing false positives.

Main brands and activities of the group

Proximus
Proximus is the major brand of Proximus Group. The current Proximus brand bundles, amongst others, the older brands Proximus Mobile (Belgacom Mobile) and Proximus TV (Belgacom TV).

Scarlet
Scarlet was founded in the Netherlands in 1992.

Mobile Vikings
Mobile Vikings has a strong digital native customer base consisting of young people who make intensive use of mobile data. In June 2021, Proximus received approval, without conditions, from the Belgian Competition Authority for the acquisition of Mobile Vikings, which also includes the Jim Mobile brand.

Proximus Media House (PmH)
Proximus Media House is the affiliate in the Proximus Group for content editing, broadcasting, (live) production and media operations on any platform.

Connectimmo
Connectimmo is the real estate company of the Proximus Group. It manages the commercial, financial, legal, and technical aspects of the real estate portfolio of the Proximus Group (+1000 buildings/sites).

Doktr
Doktr, a company supported by Proximus, Solidaris/Socialistische Mutualiteiten and Mutualité Chrétienne/Christelijk Mutualiteit.

Proximus Ada
Proximus Ada is a Belgian "centre of excellence" combining artificial intelligence and cybersecurity. Proximus Ada is a wholly owned subsidiary of Proximus.

Tango
Tango is the company under which the Proximus Group markets its offers in Luxembourg. The company offers fixed and mobile telephony, internet and television services to residential customers and small businesses with fewer than 10 employees.

Telindus (Belgacom ICT)
Telindus was acquired by Belgacom in 2006. But in 2010, Belgacom ended Telindus as a separate legal entity and absorbed all its activities into Belgacom SA. However, the brand name is still used in Luxembourg and the Netherlands.

In Luxemburg, Telindus provides telecommunication services, ICT infrastructure, multi-cloud, digital finance, cybersecurity, business applications, managed services and training services to medium-sized and large companies, as well as public administrations.

BICS (Belgacom International Carrier Services)
BICS (Belgacom International Carrier Services) founded in 2005, is a joint venture between Belgacom, Swisscom Fixnet and MTN Group. BICS is an international communications enabler, one of the key global voice carriers and a provider of mobile data services worldwide. BICS aims to make it possible for every person, application, and thing to connect, wherever they are.

Telesign
Telesign is a digital identity and engagement company.

Group structure

In 2022, Proximus Group has 9 different departments: the department of the CEO, Consumer Market, Enterprise Market, Corporate Affairs, Network & Wholesale, Customer Operations, Human Capital, Digital & IT and Finance.

Shareholding structure
Situation as of 31 January 2021:

 Belgian state: 53.51%
 Belgacom NV/SA: 4.52%
 Floating shares on the stock market: 41.97%

Financial data
Financial data in millions of euros:

GCHQ hack

UK's intelligence, security and cyber agency GCHQ hacked Belgacom in 2012/2013. Material from whistleblower Edward Snowden's leak in 2013 indicated that the British intelligence service directed a cyber-attack code-named Operation Socialist against the computer network of Belgacom using Regin malware. The hack made the company realise how important is it to put constant focus on cyber security. In 2020, Proximus invested €7.5 million in its Corporate Cyber Security Program and in 2022 Proximus created Proximus ADA, a new subsidiary dedicated to AI and cybersecurity.

See also

 Belgacom Towers
 European Competitive Telecommunications Association
 John J. Goossens
 Bessel Kok

References

 
Telecommunications companies of Belgium
Belgian brands
Dutch-language television networks
Belgian Royal Warrant holders
Companies based in Brussels
Companies listed on Euronext Brussels